The table below lists the reasons delivered from the bench by the Supreme Court of Canada during 1998. The table illustrates what reasons were filed by each justice in each case, and which justices joined each reason. This list, however, does not include decisions on motions.

Of the 85 judgments released in 1998, 26 were oral. There were also motions.

Reasons

Key

Notes

External links
 1998 decisions: CanLII LexUM

Reasons Of The Supreme Court Of Canada, 1998
1998